The United States census of 1920, conducted by the Census Bureau during one month from January 5, 1920, determined the resident population of the United States to be 106,021,537, an increase of 15.0 percent over the 92,228,496 persons enumerated during the 1910 census.

Despite the constitutional requirement that House seats be reapportioned to the states respective of their population every ten years according to the census, members of Congress failed to agree on a reapportionment plan following this census, and the distribution of seats from the 1910 census remained in effect until 1933. In 1929, Congress passed the Reapportionment Act of 1929 which provided for a permanent method of reapportionment and fixed the number of Representatives at 435.

This was the first census in which the United States recorded a population of more than 100 million. It was also the first census in which a stateNew Yorkrecorded a population of more than ten million. 

This census also marked a significant population shift from rural to urban.  According to the Census Bureau, "Beginning in 1910, the minimum population threshold to be categorized as an urban place was set at 2,500. "Urban" was defined as including all territory, persons, and housing units within an incorporated area that met the population threshold. The 1920 census marked the first time in which over 50 percent of the U.S. population was defined as "urban."

Census questions
The 1920 census collected the following information:

 Age
 Single
 If foreign born, year of immigration to the U.S., whether naturalized and, if so, year of naturalization
 School attendance
 Literacy
 State of residence
 If foreign-born, the mother tongue
 Ability to speak English
 Occupation, industry, and class of worker
 Whether home owned or rented, and, if owned, whether free or mortgaged

Full documentation for the 1920 census, including census forms and enumerator instructions, is available from  the Integrated Public Use Microdata Series.

State rankings

Territories

City rankings

Data availability
The original census enumeration sheets were microfilmed by the Census Bureau in the 1940s, after which the original sheets were destroyed.  The microfilmed census is available in rolls from the National Archives and Records Administration. Several organizations also host images of the microfilmed census online, and digital indices.

Microdata from the 1920 census are freely available through the Integrated Public Use Microdata Series. Aggregate data for small areas, together with electronic boundary files, can be downloaded from the National Historical Geographic Information System.

Notes

External links

 1921 U.S Census Report Contains 1920 census results
 Historic US Census data
 1920 Census
 [census.gov/population/www/censusdata/PopulationofStatesandCountiesoftheUnitedStates1790-1990.pdf]
 1920 census on archive.org

United States Census, 1920
United States census
United States